The 2016–17 Argentine Torneo Federal A, was the 4th season of the third tier of the Argentine football league system. The tournament is reserved for teams indirectly affiliated to the Asociación del Fútbol Argentino (AFA), while teams affiliated to AFA  have to play the Primera B Metropolitana, which is the other third tier competition. The champion was promoted to Primera B Nacional. 36 teams are competing in the league, 32 returning from the 2016 season, 1 team that was relegated from Primera B Nacional and 3 teams promoted from Federal B. The regular season began on September 3, 2016 and ended on July 16, 2017.

Format

First stage
The teams were divided into six zones with five teams and one zone with six teams (a total of 36 teams) in each zone and it was played in a round-robin tournament whereby each team played each one of the other teams four times. The teams placed 1º and 2º from the zones with 5 teams, the teams placed 1º, 2º and 3º from the zone with six teams and the three best 3º team from the zones with five teams qualified for the Second Stage. The other eighteen teams qualify for the Revalida Stage.

Championship stages

Second stage
The teams were divided into two zones with nine teams each and it was played in a round-robin tournament whereby each team played each one of the other teams one time. The teams placed 1º and 2º and the best 3º team from the two zones qualified for the Third Stage or Pentagonal Final. The other thirteen (13) teams qualify for the Revalida Stage.

Third stage
The five teams that qualified for the third stage or Pentagonal Final play in a round-robin tournament whereby each team played each one of the other teams one time. The winner was declared champion and automatically promoted to the Primera B Nacional. The other four teams qualify for the Fifth Phase of the Revalida Stage.

Revalida stages
The Revalida Stage is divided in several phases: First, the eighteen teams that did not qualify for the Championship Stages were divided into three zones with six teams each and it was played in a round-robin tournament whereby each team played each one of the other teams two times. The teams placed 1º and 2º from the three zones qualified for the Second Phase. The second phase is played between the six teams that qualified from the First Phase. The tree winners qualify for the Third Phase.
The Third, Fourth, Five, Sixth and Seventh Phase of the Revalida Stage is played between the other teams that did not qualify for the Championship Stages or were eliminated from it and aims to get the Second promotion to the Primera B Nacional.

Relegation
After the First Phase of the Revalida Stage a table was drawn up with the average of points obtained in the First Stage and the First Phase of the Revalida Stage it is determined by dividing the points by the number of games played and the bottom team of each three zones was relegated to Torneo Federal B.

Club information

Zone A

Zone B

1 Play their home games at Estadio José María Minella.

Zone C

Zone D

Zone E

Zone F

1 Play their home games at Estadio Antonio Romero.

Zone G

First stage

Zone A

Results

Matches 1–8

Matches 9–16

Zone B

Results

Matches 1–10

Matches 11–20

Zone C

Results

Matches 1–8

Matches 9–16

Zone D

Results

Matches 1–8

Matches 9–16

Zone E

Results

Matches 1–8

Matches 9–16

Zone F

Results

Matches 1–8

Matches 9–16

Zone G

Results

Matches 1–8

Matches 9–16

Ranking of third-placed teams

Championship stages

Second stage

Zone A

Results

Zone B

Results

Ranking of third-placed teams

Third stage

Results

Reválida stage

First phase

Zone A

Results

Zone B

Results

Zone C

Results

Second to seventh phase

Second phase

|-

|-

|-

Third phase

|-

|-

|-

|-

|-

|-

|-

|-

Fourth phase

|-

|-

|-

|-

Fifth phase

|-

|-

|-

|-

Sixth phase

|-

|-

Seventh phase

|-

Relegation

Zone A

Zone B

Zone C

Season statistics

Top scorers

See also
 2016–17 Primera B Nacional
 2016–17 Copa Argentina

References

External links
 Sitio Oficial de AFA   
 Ascenso del Interior  
 Solo Ascenso  
 Mundo Ascenso  
 Promiedos  

Torneo Federal A seasons
3